Eddy Merckx (born 4 September 1968 in Reet, Belgium) is a Belgian professional three-cushion billiards player.

Career

Season 2006/07 
In the year 2006, he beat Nikos Polychronopoulos 3–1 to win the world title in three cushions billiards. In 2007, he added the European title in Salon de Provence in France, by beating the reigning champion Frédéric Caudron.

Season 2011/12 
On 8 October 2011, while playing in the German Bundesliga in Duisburg, Merckx defeated Won Kang 50–6 in six innings, a world record. The inning breakdown was 4-9-26-7-0-4. The previous record for a 50-point game was nine innings, shared by Torbjorn Blomdahl, Frederic Caudron and Marco Zanetti.

Season 2012/13 
From 27 August to 1 September 2012 he played on the invitation tournament Cuvino Superprestige, which was held in the city of Lommel, Belgium. The Belgians where looking for the fifth time for their king of 3-cushion and in 2012 it was Merckx by beating world number one Frédéric Caudron in the final. Just a week later on 9 September 2012, he won his second UMB world title in Porto by defeating again Frédéric Caudron in the semis and Choi Sung-Won in the finals. Another week later he was playing in Suwon on the 3-Cushion World Cup and got on the third place together with Dick Jaspers from the Netherlands. He was climbing up to third place of the world ranking due to his latest wins.

Achievements 
 3-Cushion World Champion (Single): Winner 2006, 2012 • Runner-up 2009
 3-Cushion European Champion: Winner 2007 • Runner-up 2010, 2011
 3-Cushion World Cup: Winner 2005, 2009, 2011 • Runner-up 2008
 Chrystal Kelly Tournament: Third 2009
 3-Cushion Invitation Tournament in Zundert/Netherlands: Winner 2003 • Runner-up 2004, 2005
 Superprestige in Belgium: Winner 2012 • Third 2011
 Belgium Championship: Winner 2004, 2006, 2008, 2010, 2011, 2012

References

Belgian carom billiards players
World champions in three-cushion billiards
Sportspeople from Antwerp Province
Living people
1968 births
World Games silver medalists
World Games bronze medalists
Competitors at the 2013 World Games
Competitors at the 2022 World Games
20th-century Belgian people
21st-century Belgian people